The 2011–12 San Jose Sharks season was the team's 21st season in the National Hockey League (NHL).

Offseason
The Sharks, disappointed in their playoff results, traded away two major players of their team to the Minnesota Wild. Devin Setoguchi was traded for Brent Burns, and Dany Heatley was traded for Martin Havlat. Burns was targeted to fill a hole on the Sharks as a shut-down defensive presence. Heatley was traded after posting disappointing playoff results.

Season recap

Regular season
The preseason was successful, ending in a 5–1–0 record with the only loss came to Phoenix.

The Sharks started the season rather slowly; they gained a win at their opener at home against Phoenix but then lost three straight. Afterwards, the Sharks won the first five games on their six-game road trip. The win against the Devils came on a shootout, with Joe Thornton participating in his 1000th NHL career game, and the win against the Islanders by a sudden-death goal from Brent Burns, so the Sharks won both games that went into overtime. They ended this road trip with a loss against the Rangers before heading back home for a six-game stand. The first one was a win after shootout against the Penguins before losing the first game after overtime to the Predators before the next two games were won. The home stand ended with five wins and only one loss, coming against the Coyotes. The Sharks took over the first position in the Pacific Division in November and had 13 wins in the books after 20 games. After that, the Sharks lost four out of five with the only win vs. the Canadiens by a shootout. The Sharks just won one of the next five games, before they went on a four-game winning streak to take the top spot in the Pacific Division over Christmas. December was finished with two losses to the Ducks and Canucks.

The new year started with two wins on the road, another one at home and the number 1 spot in the division. After an away overtime loss vs. the Wild the Sharks captured their second shutout victory in a 2–0 win over the Jets. January was ended with two shutouts by Antti Niemi and at top of their division. February included an unsuccessful nine-game road trip.

The Sharks clinched a playoff spot on the fifth of April, their 81st game of the regular season.

The Sharks were the most disciplined team during the regular season, with only 225 power-play opportunities against.

Playoffs
In the playoffs, the Sharks faced the St. Louis Blues, a number 2 seed, in the first round, the conference quarterfinals in a best-of-seven series. The Sharks won Game 1 by a score of 3–2 after double overtime by a goal from Martin Havlat who scored twice, with Andrew Desjardins sent this game into overtime with his goal five minutes before the end of regulation. Game 2 was won by the Blues, who scored once every period, 3–0. The Blues continued their dominance by posting a 4–3 victory in Game 3, with two of the three goals by the Sharks coming in the waning minutes of the third period. The Blues then won a second straight game in San Jose, in Game 4, by a score of 2–1. The Blues led the series 3–1. With coming back over to St. Louis, the Sharks went into the third period with a lead, courtesy of a goal from Joe Thornton. The Blues, however, answered with two quick goals in the middle of the last period and scored another goal late in the game to capture the series in five games.

Standings

Schedule and results

Pre-season

Regular season
Green background indicates win (2 points).
Red background indicates regulation loss (0 points).
White background indicates overtime/shootout loss (1 point).

Playoffs

The Sharks clinched a playoff spot and made their eighth consecutive appearance in the playoffs.

Player statistics

Skaters
Note: GP = Games played; G = Goals; A = Assists; Pts = Points; +/− = Plus/minus; PIM = Penalty minutes
Updated April 21, 2012.

Goaltenders
GP = Games played; MIN = Time On Ice in minutes; W = Wins; L = Losses; OT = Overtime losses; GA = Goals against; GAA = Goals against average; SA = Shots against; SV = Saves; SV% = Save percentage; SO = Shutouts; G = Goals; A = Assists;
PEN = Penalty Time in minutes

†Denotes player spent time with another team before joining Sharks. Stats reflect time with the Sharks only.
‡Traded mid-season
Bold/italics denotes franchise record

Awards, records, milestones

Awards

Records

Milestones

Transactions
The Sharks have been involved in the following transactions during the 2011–12 season.

Trades

Free agents signed

Free agents lost

Claimed via waivers

Lost via waivers

Lost via retirement

Player signings

Draft picks
San Jose's picks at the 2011 NHL Entry Draft in St. Paul, Minnesota.

See also
 2011–12 NHL season

References

San Jose Sharks seasons
San Jose Sharks season, 2011-12
San Jose
2011 in sports in California
2012 in sports in California